Quaddick Reservoir is a man-made body of water in the town of Thompson, Connecticut. The reservoir has three sections: Lower (124 acres), Middle (203 acres), and Upper (81 acres). It originated with the completion of a dam on the Five Mile River in 1865. Quaddick State Park sits on the eastern shore of the Middle Reservoir.

References

External links
Quaddick State Park  Connecticut Department of Energy and Environmental Protection
Quaddick Lake Association

Reservoirs in Connecticut
Thompson, Connecticut
Connecticut placenames of Native American origin
Lakes of Windham County, Connecticut
1865 establishments in Connecticut